is one of the techniques adopted by the Kodokan into their Shinmeisho No Waza (newly accepted techniques) list. It is categorized as a foot technique, Ashi-waza. It is essentially a counter throw or reversal for Osoto gari.

Technique Description
As the opponent steps in to attempt an Osoto Gari, the tori defends himself by drawing back his trailing foot, and twist his own torso, in doing so cutting down the uke using the same throw.

Bibliography

See also
Judo technique
Judo Lists

External links
https://judo.ijf.org/techniques/O-soto-gaeshi

Judo technique